"Angel's Eye" is a song by American hard rock band Aerosmith. It was written by lead singer Steven Tyler, guitarist Joe Perry, and songwriting collaborators Marti Frederiksen and Taylor Rhodes. The song was released in 2000 as a promotional single and was written for the namesake film Charlie's Angels and included on that film's soundtrack. The single came on the heels of the band's #1 single "I Don't Want to Miss a Thing" (1998), also a song written for a film. "Angel's Eye" received heavy rotation on rock radio in 2000 and reached #4 on the Mainstream Rock Tracks chart.

References

2000 singles
Aerosmith songs
Songs written by Steven Tyler
Songs written by Joe Perry (musician)
Songs written by Marti Frederiksen
Songs written by Taylor Rhodes
Songs written for films
Columbia Records singles
2000 songs